Gunner is a nickname, given name, and surname. It may refer to:

People with the nickname 

 Gunner Kelly (1906–1977), Australian police officer
 Gunner McGrath (born 1978), founder, lead singer and guitarist of the punk rock band Much The Same
 Gunner Moir (1879–1939), English heavyweight boxer
 Bob Prince (1916–1985), former Pittsburgh Pirates baseball announcer nicknamed "The Gunner"
 Matt Reilly (footballer) (1874–1954), Irish goalkeeper
 Thomas Bland Strange (1831-1925), British major general known as "Gunner Jingo"

People with the given name 

 Gunner Berg (1764–1827), Norwegian priest, writer and politician
 Gunner Kiel (born 1993), American football quarterback
 Gunner Olszewski (born 1996), American football player
 Gunner Wright (born 1973), American actor

People with the surname 

 Marilyn Gunner, American physicist
 Mary Frances Gunner (1894–?), African-American playwright and community leader
 Michael Gunner (born 1976), Australian politician

See also 

 Gunnar

Lists of people by nickname
English masculine given names